Kondattam is a 1998 Indian Tamil-language drama film directed by K. S. Ravikumar. It stars Arjun and Simran.

Plot
Raja is a rich fun-loving man, whose boat ride with his friends turns tragic after his friends die in an accident. Raja is heart-broken after his fiancée Lalitha blames him for his friends' deaths. Feeling remorse for his actions, Raja writes off his properties to the families of his deceased friends. He gets a call that Anand's wife died after giving birth to a baby boy.

Raja gives the baby to Anand's family who wants him to stay in their home for some time. Except the older couple, other members initially do not like his presence but he wins their love and affection. Raja discovers that someone is attempting to kill the child. He then gets himself into a situation where he can continue staying in the house and detect the mystery.

Lalitha who is engaged to be married comes to stay in the same home and still hates Raja. During the naming ceremony of the baby, the family learns that Raja killed Anand. Arjun's servant reveals that Anand's property will be inherited by the baby. While getting thrashed by their car driver Pazhani, Raja who accidentally sees Pazhani's ring realises he was the one who attempted to kill the baby.

Pazhani was in love with Purushothaman's daughter and had an eye on the property, after coming to know that child is the heir of the property he tried to kill it. In the end, Raja marries Lalitha and becomes a part of the huge family.

Cast

 Arjun as Raja (Ramu)
 Simran as Lalitha
 Manthra as Vidhya
 Gemini Ganesan as Anand's grandfather
 Vijayakumar as Purushothaman
 Jai Ganesh as Rajarathnam
 Ramesh Khanna as Pazhani
 R. Sundarrajan as Bhaskaran
 Rajeev as Anand's uncle
 Sowcar Janaki as Janaki
 Raja as Gopikrishna
 Sathyapriya as Vidya's mother
 K. R. Vatsala as Bhaskaran's wife
 Anand Babu as Babu 
 Anand as Anand
 Chinni Jayanth as Siva
 Delhi Ganesh as Raja's servant
 Saradha Preetha as Saradha
 Sheela Kaur as Anjali
 Subhashini as Anand's aunt
 Lavanya as Purushothaman's daughter
 Idichapuli Selvaraj as Watchman
 Mahendran as Mahendran
 K. S. Ravikumar in a cameo appearance

Production
The film was developed with the working title of Uthama Puthiran, before the team changed title. Sivaji Ganesan was initially considered to play the patriarchal head of the family, though his unavailability meant that Gemini Ganesan was selected instead.

Soundtrack

The film soundtrack features score and 6 songs composed by Maragatha Mani, with lyrics by Kalidasan. Unlike other Tamil films he worked where he was credited as Maragathamani, here in this film he was credited by his real name Keeravani.

Reception
Indolink wrote "the movie is alright for family viewing". Geocities wrote "For the number of actors in Kondattam, the movie also has equal number of plot elements in it. It has love (both as in kadhal and jollu), friendship, tragedy, humor, action, master-servant relationship, drama etc. It almost feels like you have seen all of the scenes in the movie before. But the overall plot line is not that common. However it too resembles the plot of Nirai Kudam (Starring Sivaji Ganesan)".

References

External links

1998 films
Indian drama films
Films scored by M. M. Keeravani
1990s Tamil-language films
Films directed by K. S. Ravikumar